Sarah Dawn Finer (born 14 September 1981) is a Swedish singer, songwriter and actress. Her father is of English heritage from the United Kingdom, her mother is Jewish from the United States, and she was born and raised in Sweden. As a student, she attended the Adolf Fredrik's Music School, a high-profile song-and-chorus school in Stockholm, where she was also president of the students' union. She is also known for playing Lynda Woodruff, the "official" spokesperson of the European Broadcasting Union (EBU) in Melodifestivalen and the Eurovision Song Contest, a character created by Edward af Sillén.

Background
Finer was born and grew up in Sweden with British and American roots through her parents David Finer and Francine Lee Mirro-Finer. Her sister Zoie Finer and half-brother Rennie Mirro are also singers. Her paternal grandmother Dorothy Irving was a music coach and professor in Stockholm.

In 1989, she appeared on Swedish television as a child actor, and as a result she toured Sweden with her sister Zoie and other children. In 1994, she had a principal part in the Bert  TV series and was also in a soul gospel choir for seven years. While working as a backing vocalist behind several famous singers, she also attended the Adolf Fredrik's Music School.

Solo music career
Finer's first EP "Sarah Dawn Finer" with 6 songs, was released in 2006. Her first full-length debut album A Finer Dawn, released 30 May 2007, debuted at number two on the Swedish album charts. The singles from the album were "I Remember Love", "Stockholm by Morning" and "A way back to love".

Her next album Moving On was released on 26 August 2009. The album included the title single "Moving On" and "Does She Know You?" and "Standing Strong". The album Moving On debuted at Number 1 on iTunes in its digital release on 17 August 2009. The CD version was released on 26 August 2009, debuting at Number 1 in the Swedish Charts.

Both the singles "I Remember Love" and "Moving On" were the most played songs on Swedish radio in 2007 and 2009. Her 3rd album "Winterland" also sold gold and debuted at Number 2 on the Swedish charts. She made a holiday special live from Hamburger Börs 2010 for SVT, and went on a critically acclaimed tour with "Winterland" in 2011. Her fourth album was "Sanningen Kommer Om Natten" 2011, which received 5/5 in DI Weekend by Jan Gradvall, after which she went on a critically acclaimed live tour with 2012. She received a songwriting award/scholarship from SKAP in 2012. She has recorded duets with Moneybrother, Peter Jöback, Mauro Scocco, Tommy Körberg, Fatboy, Samuel Ljungbladh and Patrik Isaksson.

Musicals
She was nominated for "Best Actress in a leading role" for her part as "Lucy" in Jekyll & Hyde at Chinateatern 2008. 
She also starred as Joanne in "Rent" – the rock musical in 2001, 2002 and 2003 at Göta Lejon, a tour with Riksteatern and at Göteborgs Operan. 
She starred in "Godspell" the musical at Parkteatern/Stockholms Stadsteater 2002.

Shows
Finer was featured in "Ugglas Revy" with Magnus Uggla at Chinateatern 2010; "Livet" with Jonas Gardell 2002 and 2003; "Happy Holidays" at The Grand Hotel (Stockholm) with brother Rennie Mirro and Karl Dyall in 2012; and "Humorator" there 2006 with Mikael Tornving, Henrik Hjelt and Ulf Kvensler.

She was Swedish television's Christmas Host for 2012 on SVT. Finer was one of three hosts of the radio/television music aid show Musikhjälpen in December 2013.

She is the current host of the Swedish musical game show, Så ska det låta.

Melodifestivalen and Eurovision participation

Finer entered Melodifestivalen 2007 with "I Remember Love", which she co-wrote with Peter Hallström. The song qualified to the final in Globen, Stockholm, from the fourth heat in Gävle. In the final, the song placed fourth and became a chart success in Sweden (most played song on Swedish radio in 2007), and was also certified gold.
She competed in Melodifestivalen 2009 with "Moving On", which qualified to the final through the Second Chance round. Finer later presented the Swedish votes in that year's Eurovision Song Contest final on 16 May. "Moving On" was also released with remixes and an acoustic version. It was the most played song on Swedish radio in 2009.
Finer hosted Melodifestivalen 2012 alongside Helena Bergström and Gina Dirawi. In a sketch recorded for the final, Finer played Lynda Woodruff, an English EBU spokeswoman. She reprised her role for a European audience when delivering Sweden's votes in the final of the Eurovision Song Contest 2012, and again in Melodifestivalen 2013 where she first introduced Stockholm as host city of the Eurovision Song Contest 2013 before being made aware of it being hosted in Malmö, where she then continued her sketch.
Finer returned as Lynda Woodruff for the Eurovision Song Contest 2013 in a series of sketches introducing Sweden to viewers. She also appeared as herself in the final, performing "The Winner Takes It All", which she later released as a single.
Finer was a commentator for Eurovision Song Contest's Greatest Hits alongside Christer Björkman on 4 April 2015.
In the fourth semi-final of Melodifestivalen 2016, Finer was once again a host alongside Gina Dirawi. In the contest's final she appeared in the interval act medley singing her 2009 entry "Moving On", and also reprised her role as Lynda Woodruff in a sketch welcoming viewers to Stockholm, the host city of the Eurovision Song Contest 2016. She later returned as Woodruff for a live sketch at the Eurovision 2016 final.
Finer co-hosted all six shows of Melodifestivalen 2019 alongside Eric Saade, Marika Carlsson and Kodjo Akolor.
Finer co-hosted Sveriges 12:a, the Swedish replacement program for the cancelled Eurovision Song Contest 2020, alongside Christer Björkman.

Discography

Albums

EPs

Singles

Other non-charting
2007: "A Way Back to Love"
2007: "Stockholm by Morning"
2008: "Does She Know You"
2010: "I'll Be Your Wish Tonight"
2011: "Is Anybody There"

Filmography
2015 - Arne Dahl - En midsommarnattsdröm
2014 - Kärlek deluxe
2014 - The Pirate Fairy (Swedish version, voice)
2012 - The Lorax (Swedish version, voice)
2012 - Secret of the Wings (Swedish version, voice)
2011 - Hop (Swedish version, voice)
2009 - Så olika
2009 - The Princess and the Frog (Swedish version, voice)
2007 - Elias and the Royal Yacht (Swedish version, voice)
2001 - Pokémon 3: The Movie (Swedish version, voice)
1995 - Bert: The Last Virgin
1994 - Bert (TV series)
1989 - Maskrosbarn (TV movie)

References

External links
 
 Sarah Dawn Finer on MySpace
 
 

1981 births
Living people
Singers from Stockholm
Swedish Jews
English-language singers from Sweden
Swedish-language singers
Swedish people of American descent
Swedish people of British descent
Swedish songwriters
Swedish television actresses
Swedish soul singers
Swedish gospel singers
Swedish pop singers
21st-century Swedish singers
21st-century Swedish women singers
Melodifestivalen contestants of 2009
Melodifestivalen contestants of 2007
Melodifestivalen contestants of 2006